Donatien Bouché (May 10, 1882–1965) was a French sailor who competed in the 1928 Summer Olympics.

In 1928 he was a crew member of the French boat l'Aile VI which won the gold medal in the 8 metre class.

References 
 

1882 births
French male sailors (sport)
Olympic gold medalists for France
Olympic sailors of France
Sailors at the 1928 Summer Olympics – 8 Metre
1965 deaths
Olympic medalists in sailing

Medalists at the 1928 Summer Olympics
20th-century French people